The House of Hohenlohe is a former German princely dynasty. It ruled an immediate territory within the Holy Roman Empire which was divided between several branches. The Hohenlohes became imperial counts in 1450. The county was divided numerous times and split into several principalities in the 18th century.

In 1806 the Princes of Hohenlohe lost their independence through mediatisation initialized by Napoleon, and their lands became parts of the kingdoms of Bavaria and of Württemberg by the Act of the Confederation of the Rhine (12 July 1806), a confederation of client states of the First French Empire. In 1806 the area of Hohenlohe was 1,760 km² and its estimated population was 108,000.

Having lost their Imperial immediacy, the Princes of Hohenlohe still kept their private possessions. Until the German Revolution of 1918–19, just as other mediatized families, they also retained important political privileges. They were considered equal by birth (Ebenbürtigkeit) to the European sovereign houses. In Bavaria, Prussia and Württemberg the Princes of Hohenlohe received hereditary seats in the Houses of Lords. In 1825, the German Confederation recognized the right of all members of the house to be styled Serene Highness (Durchlaucht), with the title Fürst for the heads of its branches, and princes/princesses for the other members.

History 

The first ancestor was mentioned in 1153 as Conrad, Lord of Weikersheim, who according to some sources was the son of Conrad von Pfitzingen and his wife Sophie, illegitimate daughter of Conrad III Hohenstaufen, King of Germany. His son Conrad jun. called himself Lord of Hohenloch (or Hohlach), after he moved to Hohlach Castle (no longer existing), near Simmershofen, where the family had the Geleitrecht (right of escorting travellers and goods and charging customs) along the Tauber river on the trading route between Frankfurt and Augsburg. His brothers Heinrich I and Albert also took on the name Hohenloch (which later was to become Hohenlohe). The dynasty's influence was soon perceptible between the Franconian valleys of the Kocher, Jagst and Tauber rivers, an area that was to be called the Hohenlohe Plateau. Their main seats were Weikersheim, Hohlach and Brauneck (near Creglingen).

Heinrich I of Hohenlohe died in 1183. His younger son Heinrich von Hohenlohe (d. 1249) became Grand Master of the Teutonic Order. His grandsons, Gottfried and Conrad, supporters of Emperor Frederick II, founded the lines of Hohenlohe-Hohenlohe and Hohenlohe-Brauneck in 1230, the names taken from their respective castles. The emperor granted them the Italian counties of Molise and Romagna in 1229/30, but they were not able to hold them for long. Gottfried was a tutor and close advisor to the emperor's son king Conrad IV. When the latter survived an assassination attempt plotted by bishop Albert of Regensburg, he granted Gottfried some possessions of the Prince-Bishopric of Regensburg, namely the Vogt position for the Augustine Stift at Öhringen and the towns of Neuenstein and Waldenburg. Gottfried's son Kraft I acquired the town of Ingelfingen with Lichteneck Castle. In 1253 the town and castle of Langenburg were inherited by the lords of Hohenlohe, after the lords of Langenburg had become extinct. During the Interregnum the Hohenlohe sided with the Prince-Bishopric of Würzburg and defeated the count of Henneberg and his coalition at the Battle of Kitzingen gaining Uffenheim in the aftermath. In 1273 Kraft of Hohenlohe fought at the Battle on the Marchfeld on the side of king Rudolf of Habsburg. By 1300, town and castle Schillingsfürst had also passed into the possession of the Hohenlohe lords.

Hohlach later became part of the Principality of Ansbach, a subsequent state of the Hohenzollern Burgraviate of Nuremberg, to which the Hohenlohe family had sold the nearby town of Uffenheim in 1378, and Hohlach some time later. Yet, the name Hohenlohe remained attached to the county with its other territories.

The branch of Hohenlohe-Brauneck became extinct in 1390, its lands were sold to the Hohenzollern margraves of Ansbach in 1448. Hohenlohe-Hohenlohe was divided into several branches, two of which were Hohenlohe-Weikersheim and Hohenlohe-Uffenheim-Speckfeld (1330-1412). Hohenlohe-Weikersheim, descended from count Kraft I (died 1313), also underwent several divisions, the most important following the deaths of counts Albert and George in 1551. At this time the two main branches of Hohenlohe-Neuenstein and Hohenlohe-Waldenburg were founded by George's sons. Meanwhile, in 1412, the branch of Hohenlohe-Uffenheim-Speckfeld had become extinct, and its lands passed to other families by marriage. George Hohenlohe was prince-bishop of Passau (1390–1423) and archbishop of Esztergom (1418–1423), serving King Sigismund of Hungary (the later King of Bohemia and Holy Roman Emperor).

In 1450, Emperor Frederick III granted Kraft of Hohenlohe (died 1472) and his brother, Albrecht, the sons of Elizabeth of Hanau, heiress to Ziegenhain, the title Count of Hohenlohe and Ziegenhain and invested them with the County of Ziegenhain. Actually, the Landgraves of Hesse soon took the County of Ziegenhain, and the House of Hohenlohe eventually gave up the reference to Ziegenhain. However, their lordship of Hohenlohe was elevated to the status of an imperial county in 1495. The county remained divided between several family branches, however still being an undivided Imperial Fief under the imperial jurisdiction, and was to be represented by the family's senior vis-à-vis the imperial court.

The Hohenlohes were Imperial Counts having two voices in the Diet (or Assembly, called Kreistag) of the Franconian Circle. They also had six voices in the Franconian College of Imperial Counts (Fränkisches Reichsgrafenkollegium) of the Imperial Diet (Reichstag). The right to vote in the Imperial Diet gave a German noble family the status of imperial state (Reichsstände) and made them belong to the High Nobility (Hoher Adel), on a par with ruling princes and dukes.

By 1455, Albrecht of Hohenlohe had acquired the castle and lordship of Bartenstein (near Schrozberg). In 1472 the town and castle of Pfedelbach were bought by the Hohenlohe family. In 1586, Weikersheim was inherited by count Wolfgang who reconstructed the medieval Weikersheim Castle into a Renaissance palace. When the last Weikersheim count, Carl Ludwig, died around 1760, his lands were divided between the Langenburg, Neuenstein and Öhringen branches; in 1967, Prince Constantin of Hohenlohe-Langenburg sold Weikersheim Castle, meanwhile a museum, to the state.

The existing branches of the Hohenlohe family are descended from the lines of Hohenlohe-Neuenstein and Hohenlohe-Waldenburg, established in 1551 by Ludwig Kasimir (d. 1568) and Eberhard (d. 1570), the sons of Count Georg I (d. 1551). Since Georg had become protestant on his deathbed, the reformation was introduced in the county and confirmed by the Peace of Augsburg in 1556. In 1667 however, a confessional division arose when the two sons of Georg Friedrich II of Hohenlohe-Waldenburg-Schillingsfürst, Christian (founder of the Bartenstein line) and Ludwig Gustav (founder of the Schillingsfürst line), converted to the Roman Catholic Church. After the extinction of two other side lines, Waldenburg in 1679 and Waldenburg-Pfedelbach in 1728, the whole property of the main branch Hohenlohe-Waldenburg was inherited by the catholic counts.

Of the Lutheran branch of Hohenlohe-Neuenstein, which underwent several partitions and inherited the county of Gleichen in Thuringia (with its residence in Ohrdruf) in 1631, the senior line became extinct in 1805, while in 1701 the junior line divided itself into three branches, those of Hohenlohe-Langenburg, Hohenlohe-Ingelfingen and Hohenlohe-Kirchberg. The branch of Kirchberg died out in 1861, with its lands and castle passing to the Öhringen-Neuenstein branch (sold in 1952), but the branches of Hohenlohe-Langenburg (residing at Langenburg Castle) and Hohenlohe-Ingelfingen still exist, the latter being divided into Hohenlohe-Ingelfingen-Öhringen (which became extinct in 1960) and Hohenlohe-Oehringen (today residing at Neuenstein Castle). The two actual heads of the branches of Langenburg and Oehringen are traditionally styled Fürst.

Frederick Louis, Prince of Hohenlohe-Ingelfingen, had acquired the estates of Slawentzitz, Ujest and Bitschin in Silesia by marriage in 1782, an area of 108 square miles, where his grandson Hugo zu Hohenlohe-Öhringen, Duke of Ujest, established calamine mines and founded one of the largest zinc smelting plants in the world. His son, prince Christian Kraft (1848-1926), sold the plants and went almost bankrupt with a fund in which he had invested in 1913; the mines he had still kept were, however, divided between Germany and Poland, together with Upper Silesia, in 1922, and in 1945 were depropriated by communist Poland.

The Roman Catholic branch of Hohenlohe-Waldenburg was soon divided into three side branches, but two of these had died out by 1729. The surviving branch, that of Schillingsfürst, was divided into the lines of Hohenlohe-Schillingsfürst and Hohenlohe-Bartenstein, with further divisions following. The four catholic lines which still exist today (with their heads styled Fürst) are those of Hohenlohe-Schillingsfürst (at Schillingsfürst), Hohenlohe-Waldenburg-Schillingsfürst (at Waldenburg), Hohenlohe-Jagstberg (at Haltenbergstetten) and Hohenlohe-Bartenstein (at Bartenstein). A side branch of the House of Hohenlohe-Schillingsfürst inherited the dukedom of Ratibor in Silesia in 1834, together with the principality of Corvey in Westphalia. While the Silesian property was expropriated in Poland in 1945, Corvey Abbey remains owned by the Duke of Ratibor to this day, together with further inherited properties in Austria.

The Holy Roman Emperors granted the title of Imperial Prince (Reichsfürst) to the Waldenburg line (in 1744) and to the Neuenstein (Öhringen) line (in 1764).

In 1757, the Holy Roman Emperor elevated possessions of the Waldenburg line to the status of Imperial Principality.

In 1772, the Holy Roman Emperor elevated possessions of the Neuenstein and Langenburg lines to the status of Imperial Principality.

On 12 July 1806, the principalities became parts of the kingdoms of Bavaria and of Württemberg by the Act of the Confederation of the Rhine. Therefore, the region of Hohenlohe is presently located for the most part in the north eastern part of the State of Baden-Württemberg (forming the counties of Hohenlohe, Schwäbisch Hall and the southern part of Main-Tauber-Kreis), with smaller parts in the Bavarian administrative districts of Middle Franconia and Lower Franconia. The Hohenlohisch dialect is part of the East Franconian German dialect group and the population still values its traditional distinct identity.

Rulers

House of Hohenlohe

Partitions of Hohenlohe under House of Hohenlohe rule

Table of rulers

Family members

Notable members of the von Hohenlohe family include:
Heinrich von Hohenlohe, 13th-century Grand Master of the Teutonic Knights
Gottfried von Hohenlohe, 14th-century Grand Master of the Teutonic Knights
Frederick Louis, Prince of Hohenlohe-Ingelfingen (1746–1818), Prussian general
Louis Aloy de Hohenlohe-Waldenburg-Bartenstein (1765–1829), marshal and peer of France
August, Prince of Hohenlohe-Öhringen (1784–1853), general
Prince Alexander of Hohenlohe-Waldenburg-Schillingsfürst (1794–1849), priest
Kraft, Prinz zu Hohenlohe-Ingelfingen (1827–1892), Prussian general and writer
Victor I, Duke of Ratibor, Prince of Corvey, Prince of Hohenlohe-Schillingsfürst (1818–1893)
Prince Chlodwig zu Hohenlohe-Schillingsfürst (1819–1901), Chancellor of Germany
Gustav Adolf Hohenlohe (1823–1896), a Roman Catholic cardinal
Prince Konrad of Hohenlohe-Waldenburg-Schillingsfürst (1863–1918), Austrian statesman and aristocrat
Friedrich Franz, Prince von Hohenlohe-Waldenburg-Schillingsfürst (1879–1958), Austrian military attache and later German spy-master. His first wife, Stephanie von Hohenlohe (1891–1972), was a German spy in the 1930s and at the start of WWII.
 Gottfried, Prince of Hohenlohe-Langenburg (1897–1960), husband of Princess Margarita of Greece and Denmark (1905–1981), the sister of Prince Philip, Duke of Edinburgh
 Alfonso, Prince of Hohenlohe-Langenburg (1924–2003), founder of Marbella Club, Spain
 Hubertus, Prince of Hohenlohe-Langenburg (b. 1959), competitive skier, singer, music producer 
 Philipp, Prince of Hohenlohe-Langenburg (b. 1970), grandson of Gottfried, owner of Langenburg Castle
Princess Victoria of Hohenlohe-Langenburg (b. 1997), 20th Duchess of Medinaceli etc, Grandee of Spain, who is, with 43 titles, the most titled person in the world

Castles of the House of Hohenlohe 
(*) still owned by members of the House of Hohenlohe

Heads of existing branches

Neuenstein line (Lutheran) 
 Hohenlohe-Langenburg branch: Philipp, 10th Prince of Hohenlohe-Langenburg (born 1970), at Langenburg castle
 Hohenlohe-Oehringen branch: Kraft, 9th Prince of Hohenlohe-Oehringen, 5th Duke of Ujest (born 1933), at Neuenstein castle

Waldenburg line (Catholic) 
 Hohenlohe-Bartenstein branch: Maximilian, 10th Prince of Hohenlohe-Bartenstein, (born 1972), at Bartenstein castle
 Hohenlohe-Jagstberg branch: Alexander, 2nd Prince of Hohenlohe-Jagstberg (born 1937), at Haltenbergstetten castle
 Hohenlohe-Waldenburg-Schillingsfürst branch: Felix, 10th Prince of Hohenlohe-Waldenburg-Schillingsfürst (born 1963), at Waldenburg castle
 Hohenlohe-Schillingsfürst branch: Constantin, 12th Prince of Hohenlohe-Schillingsfürst (born 1949), at Schillingsfürst castle
 Ratibor and Corvey branch: Viktor, 5th Duke of Ratibor and 5th Prince of Corvey, Prince of Hohenlohe-Schillingsfürst-Metternich-Sándor (b. 1964), owner of the Imperial Abbey of Corvey, Germany, and Grafenegg and Neuaigen Castles, Lower Austria

Legion de Hohenlohe 
The Legion de Hohenlohe was a unit of foreign soldiers serving in the French Army until 1831, when its members (as well as those of the disbanded Swiss Guards) were folded into the newly-raised French Foreign Legion for service in Algeria.

Notes

References
 Genealogy of the House of Hohenlohe
 
 See generally A. F. Fischer, Geschichte des Hauses Hohenlohe (1866–1871), 
 K. Weller, Hohenlohisches Urkundenbuch. 1153–1350 (Stuttgart, 1899–1901), and 
 Geschichte des Hauses Hohenlohe (Stuttgart, 1904). (W. A. P.; C. F. A.)
Alessandro Cont, La Chiesa dei principi. Le relazioni tra Reichskirche, dinastie sovrane tedesche e stati italiani (1688-1763). Preface of Elisabeth Garms-Cornides, Trento, Provincia autonoma di Trento, 2018, pp. 152–156.

External links 

 The House of Hohenlohe
 European Heraldry page

 
Counties of the Holy Roman Empire
Principalities of the Holy Roman Empire